Erkan Taşkıran (born 22 April 1985) is a Turkish professional footballer who currently plays as a midfielder for Bandırmaspor.

Career
On 31 August 2016, he joined Bucaspor on a two-year contract.

References

External links

1985 births
Living people
Turkish footballers
Gençlerbirliği S.K. footballers
Bucaspor footballers
Kardemir Karabükspor footballers
Akhisarspor footballers
Bandırmaspor footballers
Süper Lig players
Association football midfielders
Footballers from İzmir